Wyatt Jones (born April 1, 1970) is an American sprint canoer who competed in the early 1990s. At the 1992 Summer Olympics in Barcelona, he was disqualified in the semifinals of the C-2 1000 m event.

References
Sports-Reference.com profile

External links

1970 births
American male canoeists
Canoeists at the 1992 Summer Olympics
Living people
Olympic canoeists of the United States
Place of birth missing (living people)